The 1st Kentucky Cavalry Regiment was a cavalry regiment in the Confederate States Army during the American Civil War; serving mostly in the Army of Tennessee. In late 1862 it was consolidated to constitute the 1st (3rd) Kentucky Cavalry, usually known as 3rd (Butler's) Kentucky Cavalry. The 3rd continued to serve for the duration of the war.

Service
The 1st Kentucky Cavalry was organized at Bowling Green, Kentucky and was mustered into the Confederate States Army on October 28, 1861. Commanded by Colonel Benjamin Hardin Helm the regiment briefly served in the Orphan Brigade before being brigaded with the 8th Texas Cavalry under the overall command of Joseph Wheeler. In October 1862 the depleted regiment was reformed as battalion and consolidated with the newly organized 3rd Kentucky Cavalry of Col. J. Russell Butler. In this composition it continued to serve in the Army of Tennessee for the duration of the war; usually as part of the Kentucky Cavalry Brigade in Gen. Wheeler's Corps. It surrendered with the army near Bennett Place in North Carolina on April 26, 1865.

Commanders
Col. Benjamin Hardin Helm
Ltc. Thomas G. Woodward
Col. John Adams
Maj. J. W. Caldwell
Col. J. Russell Butler
Ltc. Jacob Wark Griffith

See also
List of Kentucky Confederate Civil War units

References

Units and formations of the Confederate States Army from Kentucky
1861 establishments in Kentucky
Military units and formations established in 1861
Orphan Brigade